John Svante Johansson (14 February 1927 – 25 September 1986) was a Swedish diver who won a silver medal in the 3 m springboard at the 1947 European Championships. Next year he finished sixth in this event at the 1948 Olympics.

References

1927 births
1986 deaths
Swedish male divers
Olympic divers of Sweden
Divers at the 1948 Summer Olympics
Divers from Stockholm
Stockholms KK divers
20th-century Swedish people